The 1952 Thomas Cup competition is an international team tournament for supremacy in men's badminton (its female counterpart is the Uber Cup). Beginning in 1948–49, it was held every three years until 1982 and thereafter has been held every two years. Twelve national teams contested for the Thomas Cup in the 1951-1952 badminton season, the tournament's second edition. According to the rules then in place Malaya was exempt from earlier ties (team matches), needing only to defend its title in a conclusive challenge round tie. The other contestants were divided into three regional qualifying zones, the Pacific, Europe, and Pan America, for the early ties. The winners of each zone then played-off in Malaya for the right to face Malaya in the challenge round. For a more detailed description of the Thomas Cup format see Wikipedia's general article on the Thomas Cup.

Intra-zone summary
India qualified in the Pacific zone by beating newcomers Thailand and Australia without the loss of a match (thus, 9–0 in each case). Six of the twelve teams in the tournament contested in the European zone. Here Denmark emerged victorious, but not without a tough fight from Sweden (6–3) in the zone semifinal. In the Pan American zone with only two teams, the United States defeated Canada 6–3, trumping a fine performance by Canada's 
Don Smythe.

Inter-zone playoffs
The following four teams, shown by region, qualified for the 1952 Thomas Cup. Defending champion and host Malaya automatically qualified to defend the title it had won three years previously.

Americas
 United States

Pacific
 India
 Malaya (Exempt until challenge round)

Europe
 Denmark

In a three way single elimination tournament within a tournament, the USA received the bye and awaited the winner of the tie between Denmark and India. The results here surprised some as the Danes, affected more by Kuala Lumpur's heat and humidity, were defeated 3–6. Either Trilok Nath Seth or Devinder Mohan Lal figured in all of the matches won by India. Three days later in Singapore, however, thirty-six-year-old Marten Mendez, who seemed to draw strength from the 40 degree Celsius heat inside Happy World Stadium, beat both Seth and Devinder in singles, helping The USA to a 4–1 lead. India then gamely fought back to win a series of close matches and pull even at four matches each. It was left to the strong U.S. doubles team of Joe Alston and Wynn Rogers to fight back from near defeat in the final match and clinch the victory for the Americans.

Challenge round
An American team that no longer had the legendary Dave Freeman was further weakened when Joe Alston, a newly employed agent of the Federal Bureau of Investigation (FBI), was denied an extension of his leave. It faced a formidable Malayan squad, in Malaya, led by the cool and graceful Wong Peng Soon who, though almost as old as Marten Mendez, was still in his prime. He proved this by defeating Mendez and Dick Mitchell routinely in straight games. Malaya's most effective team member, however, might have been the quick and tenacious Ong Poh Lim who routed his opponent in the third singles match and won both of his doubles matches with Ismail bin Marjan. For the Americans, the exceptionally fit Mendez forced a third game default from Ooi Teik Hock while doubles specialist Wynn Rogers and hard smashing Bobby Williams split two close encounters with their Malayan counterparts. It was not enough against a deeper lineup, and Malaya retained the Thomas Cup at seven matches to two.

Awards

References
 tangkis.tripod.com
 Mike's Badminton Populorum 
Herbert Scheele ed., The International Badminton Federation Handbook for 1967 (Canterbury, Kent, England: J. A. Jennings Ltd., 1967) 66–69.
Pat Davis, The Guinness Book of Badminton (Enfield, Middlesex, England: Guinness Superlatives Ltd., 1983) 120, 121.

Thomas Cup
Thomas & Uber Cup
T
T
1952 in Singaporean sport
1952 in Malayan sport
Badminton tournaments in Malaysia
Badminton tournaments in Singapore